The Pascagoula River High Rise Bridge is a bridge in the U.S. state of Mississippi which carries U.S. Route 90 over the East Branch of the Pascagoula River between Gautier and Pascagoula.  The bridge opened on June 23, 2003 as a replacement for 4-lane drawbridge. Senator Trent Lott and state Highway Commissioner Wayne Brown were the first people to ride across the bridge.

References

Bridges completed in 2003
Road bridges in Mississippi
U.S. Route 90
Bridges of the United States Numbered Highway System
Buildings and structures in Jackson County, Mississippi